The Nekpai are a Hazara tribe in Badakhshan Province, Afghanistan. Nekpai Hazaras are Kunduz province.

See also 
 List of Hazara tribes
 Hazara people

References

Hazara people
Hazara tribes
Ethnic groups in Badakhshan Province